The women's 69 kilograms weightlifting event was the fifth women's event at the weightlifting competition, with competitors limited to a maximum of 69 kilograms of body mass. The whole competition took place on August 13, but was divided in two parts due to the number of competitors. Group B weightlifters competed at 12:30, and Group A, at 15:30. This event was the eighth Weightlifting event to conclude.

Each lifter performed in both the snatch and clean and jerk lifts, with the final score being the sum of the lifter's best result in each. The athlete received three attempts in each of the two lifts; the score for the lift was the heaviest weight successfully lifted.

Schedule
All times are China Standard Time (UTC+08:00)

Records

Results

 Liu Chunhong of China originally won the gold medal, but she was disqualified after a positive anti-doping retest of her 2008 sample.
 Nataliya Davydova of Ukraine originally finished third, but she was disqualified in November 2016 after she tested positive for dehydrochlormethyltestosterone.

New records

References

 Page 2641

Weightlifting at the 2008 Summer Olympics
Women's events at the 2008 Summer Olympics
Olymp